Winterpills are an American indie rock band from Northampton, Massachusetts, United States. Its members are Philip Price, Flora Reed, Dave Hower, Dennis Crommett and Max Germer, sometimes joined on tour and in studio by Brian Akey, José Ayerve and Henning Ohlenbusch. They released their debut eponymous album in November 2005 on Signature Sounds, and their second album on the same label was released February 27, 2007, titled "The Light Divides". Their third album, "Central Chambers", was released on October 14, 2008, also on Signature Sounds, and a vinyl 7" single of Broken Arm/A Folded Cloth was released in the UK on February 4, 2009 on Riot Act Records. "Central Chambers" was also released on vinyl on January 13, 2009. A 6-song EP, "Tuxedo of Ashes", was released on October 5, 2010. Their fifth release is "All My Lovely Goners", released on February 14, 2012, and the double-LP vinyl version was released on April 21, 2012. Their sixth release is "Love Songs," released March 18, 2016.

History
As veteran musicians of the Northampton indie music scene, the five members of Winterpills formed from a group of friends "hanging out at Dennis [Crommett]'s house" into a band in the winter of 2003. They began playing out regionally in New England the following spring, and released their eponymous album in 2005. Winterpills was received warmly by critics—garnering comparisons to The Byrds, Simon and Garfunkel, and Elliott Smith—and landed in the Top 100 for both iTunes and Amazon.com. The band carved out a sound characterized by acoustic folk-pop, male-female harmonies, and melancholic songwriting by Price.

Their albums have received high praise by The New York Times, Washington Post, No Depression, The Utne Reader, USA Today, Paste Magazine, Mojo, The Village Voice, and the Boston Globe, among others  They have shared the stage with Grant-Lee Phillips, Vampire Weekend, St. Vincent, Cake, Lisa Germano, Syd Straw, Juana Molina, Ladybug Transistor, The Mountain Goats, Crowded House, Erin McKeown, Fountains of Wayne, Alejandro Escovedo, Rainer Maria, Martha Wainwright, Josh Ritter among others. While touring extensively the band played Mountain Stage on NPR, and were featured on NPR's Weekend Edition and World Cafe, and XM Radio's Loft Sessions.

Members
Philip Price (vocals, guitar)
Flora Reed (vocals, keyboard)
Dennis Crommett (guitar, vocals)
Dave Hower (drums)
Max Germer (bass)
Brian Akey (bass)

Discography

Albums
Winterpills (2005, Signature Sounds/Soft Alarm)
The Light Divides (2007, Signature Sounds/Soft Alarm)
Central Chambers (2008, Signature Sounds/Soft Alarm)
All My Lovely Goners (2012, Signature Sounds/Soft Alarm)
Echolalia (2014, Signature Sounds)
Love Songs (2016, Signature Sounds)

EPs
Tuxedo of Ashes (2010, Signature Sounds/Soft Alarm)

Singles
 "Colorblind" (digital single, 2017, Signature Sounds)
 "Take Away the Words" (radio promo, 2009, Signature Sounds)
 "Broken Arm" (7", 2009, Signature Sounds)

References

External links
Official band website
Signature Sounds website
Philip Price solo website
Flora Reed website
Dennis Crommett website
José Ayerve website
Brian Akey website
Billboard.com
Stylusmagazine.com

Indie rock musical groups from Massachusetts
Musical groups established in 2003
Signature Sounds artists